The Tribulauns are three peaks of the Stubai Alps on the border between Tyrol, Austria, and South Tyrol, Italy.

References 

 Austrian Alpenverein 
 Alpenverein South Tyrol

External links 

Mountains of the Alps
Mountains of Tyrol (state)
Mountains of South Tyrol
Alpine three-thousanders
Stubai Alps
Austria–Italy border
International mountains of Europe